Breach is a small settlement in the Elham Valley about one mile (1.6 km) south of Barham(where, at the 2011 Census, the population was included) in Kent, England. It gives its name to nearby Barham Downs.

External links

Villages in Kent